Arkforce may refer to:

 Arkforce (1940), of the British Expeditionary Force during the Battle of France in 1940
 Arkforce (Force 140), created from 23rd Armoured Brigade in 1944 for security duties in Greece